Ipatinga is a municipality in eastern Minas Gerais state, Brazil. Its population is 267,333 as of 2021. It is part of the Vale do Aço (Steel Valley) metropolitan area (population 430,700).

Ipatinga is at the site where the Piracicaba River flows into the Doce River. Located 217 km far from the state capital of Belo Horizonte,  it is served by highway and railroad connections (Vitória-Minas Railway). There is also a medium-sized airport, Vale do Aço Regional Airport in the area of the neighboring city Santana do Paraíso, that serves the Steel Valley and can receive small and medium-sized planes, including jets like the Boeing 737 and the Fokker 100.

Geography 
According to the modern (2017) geographic classification by Brazil's National Institute of Geography and Statistics (IBGE), the city is the main municipality in the Intermediate Geographic Region of Ipatinga.

Despite the steel complex's presence, Ipatinga has 127 m2 of green area per inhabitant, one of the highest averages in the country. Ipanema park, Ipatinga's main park, has about one million square meters of green space with 12 thousand trees planted, one of the largest in the country.

Industry
It is the most important city of the Vale do Aço metropolitan area and it is the headquarters of one of the largest steel making complexes in Brazil, Usina Siderúrgica de Minas Gerais – Usiminas.

Sports
Ipatinga Futebol Clube, the city's main football club won the state championship in 2005 and reached the Copa do Brasil semi-finals in 2006. In 2007, it placed 2nd on the National Championship's Série B, climbing to the first division. Ipatinga Futebol Clube holds its home at Estádio Municipal João Lamego Netto popularly known as Ipatingão. The stadium was founded on 23 November 1981, and it is considered the fourth largest soccer stadium of the state of Minas Gerais. In 2013 this team changed Ipatinga to Betim.

Statistics
Climate: Tropical wet and dry (or savanna) climate (Köppen-Geiger climate classification: Aw)
Average annual temperature: 23 °C
Latitude South 19°28'46"
Longitude West: 42°31'18"

Distances from major cities:
Belo Horizonte: 217 km
Rio de Janeiro: 661 km
São Paulo: 808 km
Campinas: 830 km
Vitória: 401 km
Brasília: 935 km
Salvador: 1140 km

Sister cities
Ipatinga currently has two sister cities:
  – Kitakyushu, Fukuoka, Japan since July 24, 1978
  - Marlborough, Massachusetts, United States of America since 2009

Notable people 
 

Christian Carvalho (born 1980), Brazilian footballer

See also 

 Ipatinga massacre
 Ipanema Park

References

External links
Official website

Municipalities in Minas Gerais